Coleophora debilella is a moth of the family Coleophoridae. It is found in Armenia.

References

debilella
Moths described in 1903
Moths of Asia